The Front for the Liberation of the Enclave of Cabinda (FLEC) is a guerrilla and political movement fighting for the independence of the Angolan province of Cabinda. Formerly under Portuguese administration, with the independence of Angola from Portugal in 1975, the territory became an exclave province of the newly independent Angola. The FLEC fights the Cabinda War in the region occupied by the former kingdoms of Kakongo, Loango and N'Goyo.

History
On February 1, 1885, the Treaty of Simulambuco was signed, establishing Cabinda as a Portuguese protectorate.

In 1963, three organizations — the Movement for the Liberation of the Enclave of Cabinda (MLEC), Action Committee of the Cabinda National Union (CAUNC), and the Mayombe National Alliance (ALLIAMA) —  merged to form the FLEC.

During the Portuguese Colonial War (1961–1974), the nationalist movements of Cabinda fought against the Portuguese Armed Forces. After the Estado Novo regime which ruled Portugal and its overseas territories fell in the "Carnation Revolution" military coup of  25 April 1974 in Lisbon, independence was offered to all the territories abroad, including to Angola. In 1975 FLEC constituted a provisional government spearheaded by Henriques Tiago that proclaimed Cabindan independence from Portugal on August 1, 1975. Luís Ranque Franque was the president. 

FLEC broke into three factions; FLEC-Ranque Franque, FLEC-N'Zita, led by Henrique N'zita Tiago, and FLEC-Lubota, led by Francisco Xavier Lubota. 
In November 1977 another faction, the Military Command for the Liberation of Cabinda, was created. In June 1979 the Armed Forces for the Liberation of Cabinda created another movement, the Popular Movement for the Liberation of Cabinda (MPLC, Movimento Popular de Libertação de Cabinda). In the 1980s FLEC received help from the National Union for the Total Independence of Angola (UNITA), which opposed the MPLA-controlled government of Angola, and from South Africa. In 1988, the Communist Committee of Cabinda (CCC, Comité Comunista de Cabinda) left the FLEC, led by Kaya Mohamed Yay. In the 1990s another faction, the National Union for the Liberation of Cabinda (União Nacional de Libertação de Cabinda), led by Lumingu Luís Gimby, was created.

Another group was created by Cabindese expatriates in the Netherlands in 1996, the "Frente de Libertação do Estado de Cabinda" (FLEC (Lopes), Liberation Front of the State of Cabinda).

In December 2002, Angolan Armed Forces announced the capture of FLEC-Renovada.

FLEC-FAC continues its struggle for independence both inside and outside Cabinda. In October 2006 FLEC-FAC asked for intervention by the African Union's Commission on Human and Peoples' Rights.

Togo football team bus attack

On 8 January 2010, while being escorted by Angolan forces through the disputed territory of Cabinda, the team bus of the Togo national football team was attacked by gunmen as it travelled to 2010 Africa Cup of Nations tournament. The ensuing gunfight resulted in the deaths of the assistant coach, team spokesman and bus driver, as well as injuring several others. 

An offshoot of the FLEC claimed responsibility. Rodrigues Mingas, secretary general of the Front for the Liberation of the Enclave of Cabinda-Military Position (Flec-PM), said his fighters had meant to attack security guards as the convoy passed through Cabinda. "This attack was not aimed at the Togolese players but at the Angolan forces at the head of the convoy," Mingas told France 24 television. "So it was pure chance that the gunfire hit the players. We don't have anything to do with the Togolese and we present our condolences to the African families and the Togo government. We are fighting for the total liberation of Cabinda."

Kidnappings
Members of the group have taken several foreign citizens hostage in Cabinda. In May 2000, FLEC-FAC kidnapped three foreign and one local employee of a Portuguese contractor who were released in two months.

External support

France has a big interest in Angola. The French oil giant TotalEnergies which made a new offshore oil discovery in October 2009, has been expanding its presence in Angola. The country is the second largest contributor for production of TotalEnergies after Nigeria. According to Angolan media, France and Portugal will allow extradition of leaders of the separatist movement in the wake of the 2010 attacks on Togo's football team for which FLEC claimed the responsibility.

See also
African independence movements
List of active autonomist and secessionist movements

References

External links 
Official Government of Republic of Cabinda website 
Kabinda Nation 
FLEC Noticias 
Incidents attributed to FLEC on the START terrorism database, Profile on START 

Cabinda independence movement
Rebel groups in Angola
Angolan Civil War
Angolan War of Independence
Secessionist organizations
Separatism in Angola
National liberation movements in Africa
Nationalist terrorism
Regionalist parties
Political parties established in 1963
1963 establishments in Angola